The year 1711 in science and technology involved some significant events.

Biology
 Luigi Ferdinando Marsigli shows that coral is an animal rather than a plant as previously thought.

Mathematics
 Giovanni Ceva publishes De Re Nummeraria (Concerning Money Matters), one of the first books on mathematical economics.
 John Keill, writing in the journal of the Royal Society and with Isaac Newton's presumed blessing, accuses Gottfried Leibniz of having plagiarized Newton's calculus, formally starting the Leibniz and Newton calculus controversy.

Technology
 John Shore invents the tuning fork

Births
 May 18 – Ruđer Bošković, Ragusan polymath (died 1787)
 July 22 – Georg Wilhelm Richmann, Russian physicist (died 1753)
 September 22 – Thomas Wright, English astronomer, mathematician, instrument maker, architect, garden designer, antiquary and genealogist (died 1786)
 October 31 – Laura Bassi, Italian scientist (died 1778)
 November 19 – Mikhail Lomonosov, Russian scientist (died 1765)

 
18th century in science
1710s in science